Alien Huang (28 November 1983 – 15 September 2020), also known as Xiao Gui (Little Ghost), was a Taiwanese singer, actor, television presenter, illustrator and fashion designer.

He was a member of Japanese TV Asahi's disbanded boy band HC3 in 2002 and Taiwanese Rock Records' disbanded boy band  in 2003. He went on to release five solo albums and acted in movies and television dramas. He is known as presenter of a popular Taiwanese variety entertainment show, 100% Entertainment《娛樂百分百, which he left in early 2016.

Huang was the founder and designer of AES (Alien Evolution Studio), a clothing brand which he established in 2008. He also published three books of illustrations.

Early life
Alien Huang was born in Taipei. He grew up living with his father, younger sister and paternal grandmother. Although he lived separately from his mother due to his parents' early divorce, they still maintained a close relationship. Ever since primary school, his talent in arts and crafts had been evident as his grades were always within the top three for poster-designing projects. When he was in middle school, his father intended to train him to become a professional golf player. However, due to his interest in performing, he decided to apply to HuaGang High School of Performing Arts, where he was accepted after achieving first place out of thousands of applicants. There, he met classmate Rainie Yang, and they dated for three years. Their relationship ended when Rainie made her debut in the entertainment industry and dropped out of high school. He also put his hosting talents to use by serving as the MC of all major events held at school. In his spare time, he even worked in a fast-food restaurant. He obtained a lifeguard licence at the age of 18, and a swimming coach qualification when he was 20 years of age.

Huang chose his English name "Alien" because he hoped to be an indefinable and unique character, like aliens are, full of creativity and not confined to normality. He previously also had various other English names, including "Janson" when he was in high school and "Harry" when he was in primary school.

Career
While still in high school, Alien Huang was chosen to take part in a pre-casting training course for the film Blue Gate Crossing. Although in the end he did not participate in the film, it was during this time that he was discovered by his first manager, and he officially entered the entertainment industry at the age of 18.

In 2002, he began hosting a nature-discovery show for children named Follow Me, Go!. He then joined the Japanese-Taiwanese boy band HC3. They released their debut single "We Are Friends"《我們是朋友》, but disbanded not long afterwards.

In 2003, he became part of the boy band Cosmo, but due to a problem with the contract of one of the members, Richard（綠茶）, they disbanded after releasing their debut album《關東煮》.

In 2004, he played one of the main roles in the film Holiday Dreaming《夢遊夏威夷》.

In 2005, he started hosting various entertainment shows, and in 2006 he officially became a fixed host of the show 100% Entertainment《娛樂百分百》.

In 2007, he released a duet, "The Melody of Love"《愛的主旋律》, with co-artist Genie Chuo. He also released his first book《搞什麼鬼?!》the same year.

In 2008, he starred in the drama series Mysterious Incredible Terminator《霹靂MIT》 as one of the main roles, 747黃輝宏. He also released his first single "Fooling Around"《鬼混》 along with his second book《鬼怒穿》that year.

In July 2009, he released his first mini album Disdain《不屑》 and in December of the same year he released his first full album titled Love & Hero《愛&英雄》.

In 2010, he released another single, "Heart Amulet"《御守之心》, along with his third book,《赤鬼流》.

In 2011, he took on leading roles in the drama series Love You《醉後決定愛上你》 and "Lin Bei"《珍愛林北》, as well as the Singaporean film Already Famous《一泡而紅》. In August, he released the single "Transformers Cuz of You"《金剛變形》. In December, he released his second full album Break Heart, Black Heart《黑心傷品》.

In 2012, he starred in Taiwanese film Din Tao: Leader of the Parade《陣頭》, which earned a box office of NTD 315 million, as well as the highly rated Singaporean drama series Joys of Life. He also starred as the lead role in the Taiwanese television drama Sweet Sweet Bodyguard《剩女保鏢》, which gained high local popularity. His debut Asia concert tour G·host Tour 2012 also took place towards the end of the year, starting in Taiwan on his birthday (28 November) and continuing to Hong Kong and Singapore.

In 2013, he released his third full album, Make Sense《超有感》. He also held concerts in Taipei and Shanghai in the latter part of the year.  He won “Most Popular Male Artiste” at the 2013 Singapore Hit Awards, as well as “MeRadio Top Downloaded Hit Award (Male Artist), for which the winning female artist for the same award was Singapore singer songwriter Serene Koong (龚芝怡). He also won two awards at the 2014 HITO Radio Music Awards, namely "hito网路首播人气” and “hito舞台演绎”.

In 2016, as his focus in the entertainment industry shifted to musical and acting careers, Alien left 100% Entertainment, the only show he was hosting at the time.

In 2018, he returned to hosting when joined Jacky Wu as hosts of Mr. Player. In 2019, he joined Shiny Zhang as hosts for I'm the Best In Taiwanese, an educational program about teaching Taiwanese to the public. At the time of his death, the show finished airing its second season, totaling 26 episodes.

Death
At 11:27 a.m. on 16 September 2020, the police received a call from Huang's father, who reported that Huang was unresponsive. Huang was discovered lying between the bedroom and bathroom in his Beitou District apartment, with external injuries to the head. The paramedics who arrived at the scene pronounced Huang dead, with the body reported to already be at the stage of rigor mortis. The preliminary results of an autopsy suggested that Huang had cardiovascular disease. The autopsy concluded that Huang died of aortic dissection, but found no history of cardiovascular disease and no external injuries.

Personal life 
At the time of his death, Huang had been dating , a member of the cheerleading team the Passion Sisters, for a year and a half. Their relationship had been rumored, but was not confirmed until Wu made an Instagram post acknowledging Huang's death.

Discography

Albums / singles (solo)

Albums / singles (band)

Collaborations

Soundtrack contributions

Filmography

Television series

Film

Music videos

Acting in music videos of songs by other artists:

TV hosting

Books

Awards
 2010 Singapore Entertainment Awards（新加坡E樂大賞2010）:  Most Popular Regional Newcomer（E樂人氣海外新人獎）
 2010 Channel V:  Top 10 Chinese Golden Melodies（第一季華語十大金曲）：《搞砸了》
 2010 Hong Kong Metro Radio Mandarin Hit Music Awards（香港新城國語力頒獎禮2010）：  King of New Artistes（新人王）
 2010 Singapore Hit Awards（新加坡金曲獎2010）:   Most Acclaimed Male Artiste（新晉男歌手人氣獎）  F&N Fruit Tree Fresh Greatest Improvement Artiste（大躍進歌手獎）
 2011 Malaysia MY Astro Music Awards（馬來西亞 MY Astro 至尊流行榜頒獎典禮2011）:   Best New International Artist（至尊海外新人獎）  Golden Melody Song（至尊金曲獎）《地球上最浪漫的一首歌》
 2011 Singapore Entertainment Awards（新加坡e樂大賞2011）:  Most Popular Male Singer（e樂人氣男歌手獎） Hottest Web Celeb（omy 網絡紅人獎）
 2011 China Music Radio Top Chart Awards（MusicRadio中國Top排行榜頒獎禮2011）：  Most Recommended Album of the Year: Love & Hero（港臺年度推薦唱片）：《愛&英雄》
 2012 Singapore Entertainment Awards（新加坡e樂大賞2012）:  Most Popular Taiwanese TV Actor（e樂人氣台灣電視演員獎）  Most Popular Male Singer（e樂人氣男歌手獎） Most Popular Music Video（e樂人氣MV獎）：《六十億分之一》
 2012 Hong Kong Metro Radio Mandarin Hit Music Awards （香港新城國語力頒獎禮2012）：  Best Male Singer（國語力男歌手）  Best Mandarin Song（國語力歌曲）：《澀谷》
 2012 Singapore Blog Awards（新加坡部落格大獎2012）：  Most Popular Overseas Celebrity Blog/Microblog（最受歡迎海外名人部落格/微博）
 2013 Taiwan PixNet Entertainment Awards（台灣痞客邦娛樂丸咖獎2013）：  King of Entertainment – Silver Award（男藝人 最佳國丸 – 銀獎）  Best Album of the Year – Silver Award（年度專輯 強力放送丸 – 銀獎）
 2013 Singapore Entertainment Awards（新加坡e樂大賞2013）: Most Popular Taiwanese TV Actor（e樂人氣台灣電視演員獎）  Most Popular Cover Celebrity（e樂人氣封面人物）
 2013 Singapore Hit Awards（新加坡金曲獎2013）: Most Popular Male Artiste Award（最受欢迎男歌手獎）  MeRadio Top Downloaded Hit Award (Male Artiste)（MeRadio下载率最高金曲（男歌手）:《超有感》） F&N Fruit Tree Fresh Stylish Artiste Award（F&N Fruit Tree Fresh 时尚歌手奖）

References

External links

Alien Huang at chinesemov.com
 

1983 births
2020 deaths
Taiwanese idols
Taiwanese Mandopop singers
Taiwanese male film actors
Taiwanese male television actors
Musicians from Taipei
Male actors from Taipei
Taiwanese television presenters
21st-century Taiwanese male actors
21st-century Taiwanese male singers
Deaths from aortic dissection
Taipei City University of Science and Technology alumni